7 Women and a Murder is a 2021 Italian comedy mystery film co-written and directed by Alessandro Genovesi, serving as a remake of the 2002 film 8 Women by François Ozon, itself based on the play Huit femmes by Robert Thomas. It stars Margherita Buy, Diana Del Bufalo, Sabrina Impacciatore, Benedetta Porcaroli, Micaela Ramazzotti, Luisa Ranieri and Ornella Vanoni.

The film was released in Italy on 25 December 2021 by Warner Bros. Pictures, grossing €1,118,038. It was made available on Netflix internationally on 28 December 2022.

Cast
 Margherita Buy as Margherita 
 Ornella Vanoni as Rachele
 Micaela Ramazzotti as Veronica 
 Sabrina Impacciatore as Agostina
 Luisa Ranieri as Maria
 Diana Del Bufalo as Susanna 
 Benedetta Porcaroli as Caterina
  as Inspector Giovanni Ripoldi
 Alessandro Genovesi as taxi driver
 Luca Pastorelli as Marcello

References

External links
 
 

2021 comedy films
2020s Christmas comedy films
2020s comedy mystery films
2020s Italian films
2020s Italian-language films
Comedy film remakes
Films about dysfunctional families
Films directed by Alessandro Genovesi
Films featuring an all-female cast
Films set in the 1930s
Films set in country houses
Films set in Italy
Italian Christmas comedy films
Italian comedy mystery films
Italian remakes of French films
Murder mystery films
Mystery film remakes
Warner Bros. films